Bivane Dam (formerly known as the Paris Dam) is an arch type dam on the Bivane River, near Vryheid, KwaZulu-Natal, South Africa. It was established in 2000. Its primary purpose is for irrigation and domestic use. The owner is the Impala User Association.

Its hazard potential is ranked category 3.

Gallery

See also
List of reservoirs and dams in South Africa
List of rivers of South Africa

References
List of South African Dams from the South African Department of Water Affairs

Dams in South Africa
Dams completed in 2000
21st-century architecture in South Africa